Sabina Yeasmin is an Indian politician who has been serving as Cabinet Minister of State for Irrigation and Waterways, North Bengal Development in the Government of West Bengal. She is an MLA, elected from the Mothabari (Vidhan Sabha constituency) in the West Bengal Legislative Assembly.

Political career
She is first Muslim woman minister in Government of West Bengal in the First Mamata Banerjee ministry and current Third Mamata Banerjee ministry. Sabina Yasmin's victory from Mothabari was particularly creditable because Shehnaz Quadery, a niece of A. B. A. Ghani Khan Choudhury contested the seat as an independent candidate. She was one of the seven Muslim woman MLAs in the West Bengal Legislative Assembly. She resigned as a minister when the Congress party decided to pull out of the Mamata Banerjee government. In 2018 she joined All India Trinamool Congress.

Zilla Parishad
Sabina was Sabhadipati of Malda Zilla Parishad before contesting the assembly elections. In 2008, she won a seat in the Malda Zilla Parishad from Kaliachak – I.

Personal life
She graduated from Gour Mahavidyalaya in 2000 and completed her post-graduation from University of North Bengal in 2002.

References

External links

Living people
Bengali Muslims
Bengali politicians
West Bengal MLAs 2011–2016
West Bengal MLAs 2016–2021
Indian National Congress politicians from West Bengal
1978 births
21st-century Indian Muslims
People from Malda district
Women in West Bengal politics
West Bengal district councillors
21st-century Indian women politicians
21st-century Indian politicians
20th-century Bengalis
21st-century Bengalis
University of North Bengal alumni